The Fermi contact interaction is the magnetic interaction between an electron and an atomic nucleus. Its major manifestation is in electron paramagnetic resonance and nuclear magnetic resonance spectroscopies, where it is responsible for the appearance of isotropic hyperfine coupling.

This requires that the electron occupy an s-orbital.  The interaction is described with the parameter A, which takes the units megahertz. The magnitude of A is given by this relationships

and

where A is the energy of the interaction, μn is the nuclear magnetic moment, μe is the electron magnetic dipole moment, Ψ(0) is the value of the electron wavefunction at the nucleus, and  denotes the quantum mechanical spin coupling.

It has been pointed out that it is an ill-defined problem because the standard formulation assumes that the nucleus has a magnetic dipolar moment, which is not always the case.

Use in magnetic resonance spectroscopy

Roughly, the magnitude of A indicates the extent to which the unpaired spin resides on the nucleus. Thus, knowledge of the A values allows one to map the singly occupied molecular orbital.

History
The interaction was first derived by Enrico Fermi in 1930. A classical derivation of this term is contained in "Classical Electrodynamics" by J. D. Jackson. In short, the classical energy may be written in terms of the energy of one magnetic dipole moment in the magnetic field B(r) of another dipole. This field acquires a simple expression when the distance r between the two dipoles goes to zero, since

References

Magnetostatics
Magnetism
Electric and magnetic fields in matter